Wildfire is a 1988 American romance drama film directed  by Zalman King and starring  Steven Bauer and Linda Fiorentino.

Plot

Cast 

  Steven Bauer as Frank 
  Linda Fiorentino as  Kay
  Will Patton as Mike
  Marshall Bell as Lewis
  Richard Bradford as Gene
  Sandra Seacat as Sissy
  Ken Thorley as Bernie
  Johnny Weissmuller, Jr. as Bounty Hunter
  Juan Fernández as Man in Cantina
   Nancy Fish as Roberta
  Dennis Holahan as Mitch
   Dorothy Meyer as Esther
   Iris Butler  as Psychologist
   Angelica Marden  as Amanda
   Calvin Collins  as Josh 
  O-Lan Jones as Mrs. Johnson

References

External links 

1988 films
American romantic drama films
1988 romantic drama films
1980s English-language films
Films scored by Maurice Jarre
Films with screenplays by Matthew Bright
Films directed by Zalman King
1980s American films